The following is a list of stations owned by Innovate Corp. either under the HC2 Broadcasting, HC2 Holdings or DTV America holding company names. Innovate owns and operates 251 television stations, 248 of which are low-power facilities (with 39 as Class A licenses) and three of which operate as full-service facilities. These stations span across 112 designated market areas in the United States ranging from as large as New York, New York, to as small as Quincy, Illinois, and Traverse City, Michigan.

These stations have no local operations and rely almost entirely upon outsourced programming from third parties or the 24-hour feeds of digital multicast television networks for content; station identification is crudely inserted in from Innovate's central hub without regard to each network's local insertion opportunity and during actual programming. There is no differentiations in that sequence, all made up of a ten-second PowerPoint slide with calls, channel number and city of license in italicized Calibri, which has an inexplicably-placed default clock wipe in the middle of the sequence using the same production music cut each time. Some station identifications at times can display incorrect or out-of-date cities of license, or even the wrong identification for another station on the other side of the United States.

Innovate's companies also operate on purchasing licenses for stations hundred of miles away, and "jumping" their city of license multiple times until they land in the right metropolitan area; in one case, a station licensed to Springfield, Illinois, instead serves St. Louis, and is low power, in no way even with rimshot coverage of a part of the Springfield market.

One of these networks, Azteca América, was also owned by Innovate Corp., until ending operations on December 31, 2022. Former affiliates of Azteca América, many of which have no announced replacement programming, are listed as <Was AA>.

Current stations

Former stations

Notes

References

External links